William Richard Bradshaw (1851–1927) was an Irish-born American author, editor and lecturer who served as president of the New York Anti-Vivisection Society. He is known best for his science fiction-type novel The Goddess of Atvatabar.

Life
Bradshaw was born in 1851 in Ireland and brought to the United States as an infant. He was a resident of Flushing, Queens, New York from 1896 until his death (residing at 57 St. George's Place, Flushing, during December, 1913).

He was an active participant of anti-vivisectionism for many years.

A member of the Republican party, he served as a party district captain in Flushing. Bradshaw died after a brief illness at his home at 37 Locust Street, Flushing on July 19, 1927, aged 75. He was survived by his wife, two sons and three daughters.

Literary career

Bradshaw contributed regularly to a number of magazines, and served as editor of two of them, Literary Life and later The Decorator and, from 1890 to 1896, Decorator and Furnisher. He was also associated with Field and Stream magazine. He wrote a number of books, most importantly on vivisection, but is remembered mainly for a work of fiction, The Goddess of Atvatabar: being the history of the discovery of the interior world, and conquest of Atvatabar, a Utopian hollow Earth novel using Symmesian geography from the ideas of John Cleves Symmes, Jr. Entering the interior of the world via a Symmes Hole, the protagonists from the world above find an advanced civilization who use spiritual power to do everything from maintain youth to resurrect the dead. In a civil war that erupts following the Atvatabar Goddess's love for a surface man, Lexington White, the ruling powers are overthrown and Lexington White becomes the new king of Atvatabar, the Goddess his queen, and rich trade relations with the surface are opened. It was published by J. F. Douthitt in 1892, and featured an introduction by Julian Hawthorne and illustrations by Cyrus Durand Chapman.

Bibliography (incomplete)
 The Goddess of Atvatabar: being the history of the discovery of the interior world, and conquest of Atvatabar (1892)
 "The House. The Salon" (The Art Amateur, Oct.-Nov. 1898, Jan. 1899)
 "Carpets and Rugs" (The Art Amateur, Feb. 1899)
 "Hunting for Gold at Porcupine Lake" (Field and Stream, April 1910)
 Naturopathy the Medicine of the Future (with Benedict Lust) (1914)

References
 "Trouble for Henry G. Harris," in The New York Times, Aug. 20, 1899, page 11.
 "Arrest of Henry G. Harris," in The, Oct. 1899, page 486.
 "Charles A. Ludlum," obituary in The New York Times, Dec. 30, 1913, page 9.
 "William R. Bradshaw Dies," obituary in The New York Times, July 20, 1927, page 23.

External links
 
 
 
 
 

1851 births
1927 deaths
19th-century American novelists
American male novelists
American science fiction writers
American magazine editors
19th-century American male writers
American male non-fiction writers